Latham is an unincorporated community in eastern Mifflin Township, Pike County, Ohio, United States.  It has a post office with the ZIP code 45646.  It lies along State Route 124.

Gallery

References

Unincorporated communities in Ohio
Unincorporated communities in Pike County, Ohio